East Rockingham is a census-designated place (CDP) in Richmond County, North Carolina, United States. The population was 3,885 at the 2000 census.

Geography
East Rockingham is located at  (34.916063, -79.764259).

Demographics

As of the census of 2000, there were 3,885 people, 1,562 households, and 1,071 families residing in the CDP. The population density was 1,132.9 people per square mile (437.3/km2). There were 1,752 housing units at an average density of 510.9/sq mi (197.2/km2). The racial makeup of the CDP was 82.03% White, 11.94% African American, 1.80% Native American, 0.64% Asian, 0.15% Pacific Islander, 2.01% from other races, and 1.42% from two or more races. Hispanic or Latino of any race were 5.12% of the population.

There were 1,562 households, out of which 28.9% had children under the age of 18 living with them, 46.2% were married couples living together, 15.3% had a female householder with no husband present, and 31.4% were non-families. 27.3% of all households were made up of individuals, and 12.4% had someone living alone who was 65 years of age or older. The average household size was 2.48 and the average family size was 2.96.

In the CDP, the population was spread out, with 24.4% under the age of 18, 9.0% from 18 to 24, 28.4% from 25 to 44, 24.1% from 45 to 64, and 14.1% who were 65 years of age or older. The median age was 37 years. For every 100 females, there were 94.3 males. For every 100 females age 18 and over, there were 93.6 males.

The median income for a household in the CDP was $22,263, and the median income for a family was $26,827. Males had a median income of $26,050 versus $18,608 for females. The per capita income for the CDP was $12,132. About 24.2% of families and 26.9% of the population were below the poverty line, including 35.0% of those under age 18 and 27.0% of those age 65 or over.

References

Census-designated places in Richmond County, North Carolina
Census-designated places in North Carolina